LPI may refer to:

Places
 Linköping/Saab Airport (IATA code), Sweden
 Linus Pauling Institute, at Oregon State University, US
 Pyramide Inversée, a skylight constructed in an underground shopping mall in front of the Louvre Museum in France
 Lady Parry Island, an uninhabited island in Nunavut, Canada

Organizations
 Lunar and Planetary Institute, a scientific research institute dedicated to study of the solar system, its formation, evolution, and current state
 Linux Professional Institute, a non-profit organization that provides vendor-independent professional certification for Linux system administrators and programmers
 LPI Media, a gay and lesbian publisher in the United States

Science and technology
 Dye penetrant inspection or liquid penetrant inspection, an inspection method used to locate surface-breaking defects in all non-porous materials
 Lysinuric protein intolerance, an autosomal recessive metabolic disorder affecting amino acid transport
 Leaf plastochron index, a measure of plant leaf age based on morphological development
 Lysophosphatidylinositol, an endocannabinoid neurotransmitter
 Living Planet Index, an indicator of the state of global biological diversity, based on trends in vertebrate populations of species from around the world
 Lines per inch, a measurement of printing resolution
 Laser Peripheral Iridotomy; See Glaucoma surgery
 Liquid phase injectors and liquid propane injection, in autogas
 Low-power idle in Energy-Efficient Ethernet

Economics and finance
 Logistics Performance Index, a benchmarking tool created by the World Bank
 Limited Price Indexation, a pricing index used in the calculation of increases in certain components of scheme pension payments in the UK
 Legatum Prosperity Index, an annual ranking developed by the Legatum Institute

Other uses
 La Paz incident, occurred in May 1863 at the ghost town of La Paz in Confederate Arizona and was the westernmost confrontation of the American Civil War
 Language Proficiency Index, a Canadian standardized test for English proficiency written and administered by the University of British Columbia Applied Research and Evaluation Services
 Leading Pedestrian Interval, a type of traffic control
 Licensed private investigator, a type of private investigator
 Liga Primer Indonesia, an Indonesian top-tier football league held in 2011
 Linear partial information, a method of making decisions based on insufficient or fuzzy information

See also
 Low probability of intercept radar (LPIR), a radar system designed to be difficult to detect